McCrorie is a surname. It is derived from the Scottish Gaelic surname Mac Ruidhrí.

Notable people with the surname
Edward McCrorie (born 1936), American poet and academic of English literature
Stevie McCrorie (born 1985), Scottish singer

References

Anglicised Scottish Gaelic-language surnames
Patronymic surnames
Surnames from given names